Yaka (also: Yakaköy) is a village in the Düzce District of Düzce Province in Turkey. Its population is 583 (2022).

References

Villages in Düzce District